Kolonia Polska  is a village in the administrative district of Gmina Kuryłówka, within Leżajsk County, Subcarpathian Voivodeship, in south-eastern Poland.

The village has a population of 310.

References

Kolonia Polska